Sweet Life is the tenth studio album by Australian soul and R&B singer Renée Geyer. The album was released in March 1999 and peaked at number 50 on the ARIA Charts.

At the ARIA Music Awards of 1999, the album was nominated for ARIA Award for Best Adult Contemporary Album.

Track listing 
 "Best Times" (Renée Geyer, Kenneth Crouch) – 4:47
 "Heaven (The Closest I'll Get)" (Geyer, John Clifforth) – 4:47
 "You Broke a Beautiful Thing" (Paul Kelly) – 5:17
 "I'm Gonna Make You Love Me  (featuring CBD)  (Jerry Ross, Kenneth Gamble, Danny Williams) – 3:22
 "From Now On" (Geyer, John Clifforth, Michael den Elzen) – 4:27
 "Play Me"  (featuring Paul Kelly)  (Kelly) – 4:13
 "Knowing You Were Loved" (Peter Milton Walsh) – 4:30
 "Cake and the Candle" (Kelly) – 4:12
 "Don't Be So Sad" (Geyer, Clifforth) – 4:50
 "Killer Lover" (Kelly) – 4:27
 "My Back Room" (Dan Warner, Dror Erez) – 3:25

Charts

Release history

References 

1999 albums
Renée Geyer albums
Mushroom Records albums
Albums produced by Joe Camilleri